Szlachcin  is a village in the administrative district of Gmina Środa Wielkopolska, within Środa Wielkopolska County, Greater Poland Voivodeship, in west-central Poland.

Notable people
Marcin Szlachciński - Scholar, translator, poet, philosopher and professor at the Jagiellonian University.

References

Villages in Środa Wielkopolska County